Alisher Zhumakan (born 17 January 1997) is a Kazakh track and road cyclist.

Major results

2014
 2nd  Time trial, Asian Junior Road Championships
2015
 1st  Team pursuit, Asian Junior Track Championships
 4th Time trial, Asian Junior Road Championships
2017
 1st  Team pursuit, Asian Indoor and Martial Arts Games
 2nd Road race, National Road Championships
2019
 1st  Madison, National Track Championships (with Roman Vassilenkov)
 Asian Track Championships
2nd  Individual pursuit
3rd  Team pursuit
2020
 Asian Track Championships
2nd  Individual pursuit
2nd  Scratch

References

External links

1997 births
Living people
Kazakhstani male cyclists
Kazakhstani track cyclists
Sportspeople from Astana
Cyclists at the 2018 Asian Games
Asian Games competitors for Kazakhstan
Islamic Solidarity Games medalists in cycling
Islamic Solidarity Games competitors for Kazakhstan
21st-century Kazakhstani people